Sara Topelson de Grinberg (assumedly born in the beginning of 1945) is a Polish-born Mexican architect.

Biography 
Topelson is born to a Russian father and a Polish mother. Her family fled Nazism to Mexico, when she was three months old. She studied architecture at the Faculty of Architecture of the Universidad Nacional Autónoma de México (UNAM), architectural theory at the Instituto Politécnico Nacional and history of art at the Instituto Nacional de Bellas Artes (INBA). Together with her husband José Grinberg she established the architecture bureau Grinberg & Topelson Arquitectos, and created together with him several residential, educational, industrial, commercial and  cultural buildings, as well as recreation centers. She was professor of history of art at the Universidad Anáhuac and of its atelier of urban planning architecture. As professor she is also in charge at the International Academy of Architecture (IAA).

Since 1982, she has been responsible for international affairs of the Federation of National Colleges of Architects of the Republic of Mexico (FNCARM), and has been council member of the Union Internationale des Architectes (UIA) since 1990, where she was vice-president from 1993, and president from 1996 to 1999. Topelson was the first female president of the UIA. In May 1998 she made knighted of the Ordre des Arts et des Lettres.

Topelson was director of architecture and conservation of art estate treasures in the Instituto Nacional de Bellas Artes. She was director of urban planning in the Miguel Hidalgo delegation as well as main coordinator of the Research and Documentation center. On January 5, 2007, president Felipe Calderón Hinojosa made her undersecretary of Urban Development and Territory Planning in the Secretaría de Desarrollo Social (SEDESOL).

She is emeritus member of the Academia Nacional de Arquitectura (ANA) and of the Academia Mexicana de Arquitectura (AMA), and honorary member of the American Institute of Architects, member of the Royal Architectural Institute of Canada (RAIC), of the Asociación Nicaragüense de Ingenieros y Arquitectos, of the Colegio de Arquitectos de Venezuela, of the Royal Australian Institute of Architects (RAIA), of the Japan Institute of Architects (JIA), as well as honorary member of the Royal Institute of British Architects since 2002 and of the Consejo Superior de los Colegios de Arquitectos de España.

Awards 
 1972: "Excelencia Académica" (academic excellence), Universidad Anáhuac
 1996: "Woman of the year", bestowed by Óscar Espinosa Villarreal in order of Ernesto Zedillo
 1998: Chevalier of the Ordre des Arts et des Lettres
 1988 "Bene Merentibus" medal of the Polish association of architecture
 Silver decoration of the Colegio de Arquitectos, Cataluña
 25-year "Excelencia Académica" medal of academic merits, Universidad Anáhuac
 2003: "Mario Pani" medal, Colegio de Arquitectos de la Ciudad de México (CAM) in the Sociedad de Arquitectos de México (SAM)

References 

Mexican women academics
National Autonomous University of Mexico alumni
Instituto Politécnico Nacional alumni
Polish emigrants to Mexico
Academic staff of Universidad Anáhuac México
Chevaliers of the Ordre des Arts et des Lettres
1945 births
Living people
Mexican Jews
Mexican people of Russian-Jewish descent
Mexican people of Polish-Jewish descent
Polish people of Russian-Jewish descent
People from Mexico City
Mexican women architects
20th-century Mexican architects
21st-century Mexican architects
Presidents of the International Union of Architects